Paul King (born 28 June 1979) is an English former professional rugby league footballer who played in the 1990s, 2000s and 2010s.

Background
King was born in Kingston upon Hull, Humberside. He was a pupil at Sydney Smith School in the city.

Playing career

International honours
King won a cap for England while at Hull in 2001 against Wales (sub), and won a cap for Great Britain while at Hull in 2001 against France.

Club career
King played for Hull in the 2005 Challenge Cup Final from the interchange bench in their victory against the Leeds Rhinos. 
Hull reached the 2006 Super League Grand final to be contested against St. Helens, and King played from the interchange bench in his side's 4-26 loss.

References

External links
Paul King Ashes Profile
(archived by web.archive.org) King agrees to new deal with Hull FC
King commits to Hull
Hull prop Paul King joins Super League rivals Wakefield

1979 births
Living people
England national rugby league team players
English rugby league players
Great Britain national rugby league team players
Hull F.C. players
Rugby league hookers
Rugby league props
Rugby league second-rows
Rugby league players from Kingston upon Hull
Wakefield Trinity players
York City Knights players
Yorkshire rugby league team players